A bombing took place on 22 March 2021 in the city of Guangzhou, capital of the province of Guangdong, China, when a man detonated a bomb killing five people, including himself, and injuring five others. The perpetrator targeted a local government office in the Mingjing Village of the Panyu District, where there had been disputes between residents and officials over an alleged land-grabbing scheme. According to local media, the office attacked was responsible for land use matters, and officials had given  of land to Shanghai developers for a project to attract tourists, displacing families living in the area.

See also
2014 Guangzhou attack
Chinese property law

References

2021 disasters in China
21st-century mass murder in China
Attacks on buildings and structures in China
Building bombings in China
Crime in Guangzhou
History of Guangzhou
March 2021 crimes in Asia
March 2021 events in China
Mass murder in 2021
Suicide bombings in 2021
Suicide bombings in China
2021 murders in China
Events in Guangzhou